Worms City Museum (German - Museum der Stadt Worms or Stadtmuseum Worms) is a city museum in Worms, Germany, housed in the former Andreasstift complex. Its lapidarium is housed in the former cloister.

References

City museums in Germany
Museums in Rhineland-Palatinate
Buildings and structures in Worms, Germany